The 2012 NAB AFL Under 18 Championships was the 17th edition of the AFL Under 18 Championships. Eight teams competed in the championships: Vic Metro, Vic Country, South Australia and Western Australia in Division 1, and New South Wales/Australian Capital Territory (NSW/ACT), Northern Territory, Queensland and Tasmania in Division 2. The competition was played over five rounds, in seven states and territories, across two divisions. In the first two rounds of the competition, the second-division teams crossed over and played the division one sides, while the final three rounds of matches were played between the teams in each the division. Vic Metro and the Northern Territory were the Division 1 and Division 2 champions, respectively. The Larke Medal (for the best player in Division 1) was awarded to Vic Country's Lachie Whitfield, and the Hunter Harrison Medal (for the best player in Division 2) was won by the Northern Territory's Jake Neade.

Results

Round 1

Round 2

Round 3

Round 4

Round 5

Under 18 All-Australian team
The 2012 Under 18 All-Australian team was named on 6 July 2012:

References

Under 18